In Mandaeism, Adathan and Yadathan are a pair of uthras (angel or guardian) who stand at the Gate of Life in the World of Light, praising and worshipping Hayyi Rabbi. In the Ginza Rabba and Qolasta, they are always mentioned together. Book 14 of the Right Ginza mentions Adathan and Yadathan as the guardians of the "first river".

See also
Shilmai and Nidbai
Xroshtag and Padvaxtag in Manichaeism
Shuqamuna and Shumaliya
List of angels in theology

References

Pairs of angels
Uthras